The Pacific Marine Circle Route is a  marked scenic loop road through southern Vancouver Island in British Columbia, Canada. The route is composed of Highway 14, Pacific Marine Road, Shore Road,  Highway 18, and a segment of the Trans-Canada Highway.

The Pacific Marine Circle Route was established by the British Columbia Ministry of Tourism, Arts and Culture with the promise of an increase in tourist travel in southern Vancouver Island. It is one of British Columbia's 12 Circle Routes scattered throughout the province.

Route

Clockwise, the route heads south from Malahat, passes through Goldstream Provincial Park then briefly east to Langford, south and west to Sooke, west to Port Renfrew, north and east to Lake Cowichan, east and south to Duncan, southeast to Mill Bay, then south back to Malahat. The route can also be travelled in the opposite direction and started or finished at any points.

Points of Interest
Cowichan Lake
French Beach Provincial Park
Goldstream Provincial Park
Jordan River
Juan de Fuca Provincial Park
Pacific Rim National Park Reserve
Sooke Basin

See also
San Juan Valley
Seymour Range

References

External links
 Official signage along the Pacific Marine Circle Route
 Map of the Pacific Marine Circle Route, Times Colonist (newspaper)

Roads in British Columbia
Roads in Victoria, British Columbia